The 2009–10 Liga Femenina de Baloncesto was the 47th edition of the Spanish premier championship for women's basketball teams. Defending champion Ros Casares again defeated CB Avenida in the final to win its fourth title in a row, an overall seventh. CB Rivas and CDB Zaragoza also qualified for the championship play-offs. Ros Casares, Avenida and Rivas qualified for the 2010–11 Euroleague, while Zaragoza and CB Islas Canarias qualified for the 2010–11 Eurocup. On the other hand, Real Canoe and CB Estudiantes were relegated.

Teams by autonomous community

Regular season

1 Despite qualifying for the FIBA EuroCup Uni Girona withdrew from the competition for financial reasons. It was replaced by CB Islas Canarias.
2 Despite avoiding relegation Real Canoe withdrew from the championship for financial reasons. CB Puig d'en Valls subsequently bought its place in the championship.

Play-offs

Semifinals

Final

References

Liga Femenina de Baloncesto seasons
Femenina
Spain
Liga